The Jacksonville Daily Record, formerly the Financial News & Daily Record, is a weekly newspaper that has been published in Jacksonville, Florida since 1912.

Overview
The Daily Record primarily publishes urban development, financial, and legal related news, articles, and profiles. It is the official newspaper of The Jacksonville Bar Association, Duval County Court, and the U.S. Bankruptcy Court for the Middle District of Florida. The paper is the primary publisher of legal notices in Duval County. Synopses from documents filed by The Clerk of the Circuit Court are published.

History
Founded in 1912, The Daily Record is currently published by Observer Media Group, which bought the newspaper from third-generation owner James F. Bailey Jr. in January 2017. Bailey was publisher for 41 years. His family owned the newspaper for 104 years.

References

External links 
 

Mass media in Jacksonville, Florida
Newspapers published in Florida
Newspapers established in 1912
Northbank, Jacksonville
1912 establishments in Florida